Chlopsis kazuko is an eel in the family Chlopsidae. It was described by Robert J. Lavenberg in 1988. It is a tropical, marine eel which is known from the Gulf of California, in the eastern central Pacific Ocean. It typically dwells at a depth of 93–97 m. Males can reach a maximum standard length of 11.3 cm.

The specific epithet honours Kazuko Nakamura, an archivist at the Natural History Museum of Los Angeles County, who archived the Giles W. Mead ichthyological library.

References

Chlopsidae
Taxa named by Robert J. Lavenberg
Fish described in 1988